Mohd Farizal Rozali (born 10 September 1983 in Selama, Perak), often known as Jai among teammates and fans, is a Malaysian football player who currently plays in Malaysia FAM League for  MOF FC.

Career
Farizal previously played for northern teams Perlis FA, Kedah FA and Penang FA.

On 16 October 2008, he signed a two-year contract that confirmed his transfer from Penang to Kedah. When Kedah publicly announced Farizal's transfer, Farizal was handed the number 10 shirt; Kedah heavyweight Nelson San Martín had previously worn that number. Farizal spoke of his excitement at having joined Kedah and his eagerness to prove himself worthy as an exchange of Marlon Alex James.

In 2012, he joined PBAPP FC, a team which played in the third-tier 2012 Malaysia FAM League. In 2013, he changed clubs again, this time to Malaysia Premier League side SPA FC.

Perlis FA
In 2014, Farizal Rozali played with Perlis FA

Kedah United F.C.
In 2015, Farizal Rozali played with Kedah United F.C. in 2015 Malaysia FAM League.

Style of play
Farizal plays forward and on the flank side. Farizal has a preference for playing on the right wing, as this gives him opportunities to cut inside and take shots with his right foot, which he favours.

References

External links
 

1983 births
Living people
Malaysian footballers
Malaysian people of Malay descent
Kedah Darul Aman F.C. players
Perlis FA players
Penang F.C. players
People from Perak
Association football forwards
Association football midfielders